Bundibugyo is a town in the  Western Region of Uganda. It is the 'chief town' of Bundibugyo District and the district headquarters are located there.

Location
The direct distance is much shorter, due to the steep terrain and winding nature of the roads in the neighborhood.

The geographical coordinates of Bundibugyo town are:0°42'45.0"N 30°03'36.0"E (Latitude:0.712500; Longitude: 30.059999).

Overview
Bundibugyo is one of the most western of all Uganda's district capitals. Although Kisoro, Kanungu and Rukungiri are located further west than Bundibugyo, it is the only Ugandan district capital located west of the Rwenzori Mountains. The predominant ethnicities in the town are the Bamba and the Bakonjo. However other ethnicities coexist with them including the Batooro, Bakiga, Banyoro and the Banyankole.

Population
The 2002 national census enumerated the population of Bundibugyo at 13,782. In 2010, the Uganda Bureau of Statistics (UBOS), estimated the population of the town at 20,500. In 2011, UBOS estimated the  mid-year population of Bundibugyo at 21,600.

In 2014, the national population census put the town's population at 18,823. In 2015 UBOS estimated the town's population at 19,000. In 2020, the population agency estimated the mid-year population of Bundibugyo Town Council at 22,300. Of those, 11,400 (51.1 percent) were females and 10,900 (48.9 percent) were males. UBOS calculated that the population of the town increased at an average rate of 3.3 percent annually between 2015 and 2020.

Points of interest
The following points of interest lie within the town or close to its borders:

1. The headquarters of Bundibugyo District Administration

2. The offices of Bundibugyo Town Council

3. Bundibugyo Central Market, the largest source of fresh produce in the town

4. Bundibugyo General Hospital, a 160-bed public hospital administered by the Uganda Ministry of Health

5. A branch of Stanbic Bank

6. Bundibugyo Airport, a civilian airport

7. Ebenezer Seventh-day Adventist Church, a place of worship affiliated with the Seventh Day Adventist faith.

See also

References

External links
 Uganda: Ebola Outbreak; November 2007

Populated places in Western Region, Uganda
Cities in the Great Rift Valley
Bundibugyo District
Rwenzururu sub-region